SS Roy James Cole was a Liberty ship built in the United States during World War II.

Construction
Roy James Cole was laid down on 23 January 1945, under a Maritime Commission (MARCOM) contract, MC hull 2403, by J.A. Jones Construction, Brunswick, Georgia; she was sponsored by Mrs. Kenneth H. Cole, sister-in-law namesake, and launched on 28 February 1945.

History
She was allocated to the Blidberg & Rothchild Co. Inc., on 17 March 1945. On 3 August 1949, she was laid up in the National Defense Reserve Fleet, in Beaumont, Texas. On 2 March 1951, she was sold to Merchants Steamship Corp., for commercial use and renamed North Heaven. On 4 February 1954, she was sold to Delphi Steamship Co. In September 1954, she was sold to a Liberian shipping company. She was scrapped in 1970.

References

Bibliography

 
 
 
 
 

 

Liberty ships
Ships built in Brunswick, Georgia
1945 ships
Beaumont Reserve Fleet